EU Business School is a private business school with campuses in Geneva and Montreux (Switzerland), Barcelona (Spain), and Munich (Germany). It is a member of OMNES Education Group since 2022.

History 

EU Business School was established in 1973. Its current chairman is Carl Craen. Former president Dirk Craen became honorary president in January 2022, the year in which EU Business School joined OMNES Education Group.

Academic programs 
EU Business School offers business education programs taught in English. Its program offer includes bachelor's, master's, MBA and doctorate degrees in Business Administration (BBA, MBA, and DBA). It also provides foundation programs and an Executive BBA. 

EU Business School also offers a selection of business bachelor's, master's and MBA programs as well as its foundation and Executive BBA programs through dedicated online programs and an Online Campus.

Undergraduate and graduate programs are proposed in various business disciplines such as Communication & Public Relations, Leisure & Tourism Management, International Relations, Sports Management, Digital Business, Design & Innovation, Business Finance or Blockchain. 

Additional degree programs are possible in Spain, Switzerland, Germany, UK, Russia, Kazakhstan, Taiwan, China, US, Malaysia and Thailand. 

A Certificate program in Corporate Social Responsibility together with the International Labour Organization is proposed. 

Students can join joint programs with state accredited universities Pace University, New York, University of California, Riverside, Fisher College, Boston or Monterrey Institute of Technology and Higher Education (ITESM) awarding students two distinct bachelor's degree.

Program accreditations & certifications 

Degrees accreditations
  Across all its campuses, EU Business School offers state-accredited university degrees awarded through academic partnerships by Universidad Católica San Antonio de Murcia (UCAM), the University of Derby and London Metropolitan University (UK) as well as Dublin Business School (Ireland). These degrees are state-approved by the German government with a rating H+ on Anabin.
  All programs are professionally accredited by International Assembly for Collegiate Business Education (IACBE).
  All programs are accredited by Accreditation Council for Business Schools and Programs (ACBSP).

Institutional certifications
  International Quality Accreditation (IQA) from the Central and East European Management Development Association (CEEMAN),
  eduQua certification, Swiss Quality Label for Adult and Further Education Institutions.
  Association to Advance Collegiate Schools of Business (AACSB) member.
  EU Business School is a signatory of the Principles for Responsible Management Education (PRME).
  EU Business School is approved for American Veteran Affairs Benefits and accepts the GI Bill.

Educational affiliations 
Switzerland Swiss Federation of Private Schools, the Geneva Association of Private Schools, the Lake Geneva Region Swiss Private Schools Association, the Geneva Chamber of Commerce sponsor (since 2013), the Swiss Private School Register (SPSR), the AVDEP (Association Vaudoise de Ecoles Privées), the Swiss Association of Private Institutions of Higher Education (ASIPES/SAPIHE), and Global Education in Switzerland (GES).

International The Academy of Business in Society (ABIS), the European Council for Business Education, and the European Foundation for Management Development, the Hispanic Association of Colleges & Universities,  el Consejo latinoamericano de Escuelas de Administración, the Society for Advancement of Management (SAM),  the Educational Collaborative for International Schools (ECIS), the Mediterranean Association of International Schools (MAIS), the International Association for College Admission Counseling (IACAC), the Peter Drucker Society Europe,  the Russian Association of Business Education (RABE), the International Association of University Presidents (IAUP),  and Barcelona Global.

Rankings

Quacquarelli Symonds 

 2022, EU's MBA ranks in the top 40 programs worldwide and #43 in Europe. It achieves #1 place globally in class and faculty diversity and scores 99% in entrepreneurship.
 2021, QS Stars grants an EU a four-star rating for overall business education. The distance & online MBA degree ranks 20th in the world. The MBA ranks #42 in Europe and in the top 150 worldwide, and the MBA programs in entrepreneurship and in marketing are ranked in the top 100 programs worldwide for career specializations.
 2020, Distance & online MBA degree ranks 11 worldwide and achieves #1 place for class experience. QS ranks EU's online MBA program #15 globally.
 2019, MBA program in the top 150 worldwide and #44 in Europe
 2018, EU's online MBA is in the top 20 worldwide of its distance/online MBA ranking, achieving 100/100 for student diversity, 96/100 for class experience, and 91/100 for student quality
 2017, distance / online MBA degree ranks 14th in the world (score of 96/100) in the QS Distance Online MBA Rankings.
 2015, European MBA Programs in Spain ranked 2nd out of 46 in Best ROI. The average salary uplift after completing a master at EU Business School Spain is 138%. It is the second-lowest program fee with an average 23 months payback period. 
2013/2014, ranked 3rd in Switzerland, behind IMD and the University of St. Gallen in the QS Global 200 Business Schools Report. The rating provides an overview of selected business schools by over 2,000 employers who actively recruit MBA graduates. 
2013/2014, Spain, Switzerland, and Germany campuses ranked at the 33rd position in the QS Global 200 Business School Report.
 2013, ranked 8th in the QS Top MBA list of Women at Global 200 Business Schools.
 2011, Spain, Switzerland, and Germany campuses were ranked at 39th position in the QS Global 200 Business School Report.
 2010, EU Business School's Spain campus was ranked at 52 out of 67 in the Quacquarelli Symonds (QS) rankings for European business schools.

CEO Magazine 

 2020, EU's online MBA is ranked number 1 in the world, with its on-campus MBA ranked in Tier I.
 2017, the Online MBA ranked number 1, and the executive MBA ranked number 3 in global online rankings. The MBA program was elected tier one for European rankings.
 2016, Online MBA ranked number 1 for global online rankings. MBA and EMBA programs were elected as top tier European programs.
 2015, MBA program in joint-first position for the Global Top 20 rankings. The online MBA program ranked number 1 in global online rankings. The on-campus MBA program was part of the top-tier European MBA rankings. Executive MBA ranked first tier in the global list.
 2013, European MBA program elected top tier and Global EMBA program second tier by International Graduate Forum.

Other rankings 
 2022, Second best MBA in Spain on Forbes list.
 2022, América Economía lists EU's MBA as 20th in its 2022 Global Rankings.
 2011, Capital Magazine elected EU Business School as the 6th best business school in the world for female students.

Industry Relations

Alumni
In 2017, EU had a 26,000-strong alumni network that extended across more than 120 countries worldwide. In 46 years of existence, EU Business School awarded 24 honorary doctoral degrees. Holders of such a degree include Nick Hayek Jr., Abel Gyozevich Aganbegyan, Alexander Vinokourov and Steve Guerdat among others. Doha Bank's CEO, Dr.Raghavan Seetharaman was awarded a PhD in Global Governance, as was former President of Switzerland Adolf Ogi.

Conferences & events 
 2018–2022, hosts the Learning from Leaders series, with speakers such as Jean-Claude Biver, Paul Bulcke, Guy Verhofstadt, André Hoffmann, Ronnie Leten, Alain Dehaze.
 2017, hosts conference event with Peter Brabeck-Letmathe, chairman and former CEO of Nestlé, on the future of food at CosmoCaixa Barcelona.
 2016, collaboration with iSport Forum 2016 - international investment forum of the sport industry.
 2015, hosts the Swiss Economic Forum, the Kick-Off Romandie event.
 2014, TEDx Barcelona event organization.
 2014/2013, presents Green Cross International with a Sustainability Award, and Corporate social responsibility awards to Make-A-Wish Foundation and FC Barcelona.
 2012–2017, part of the "Atypical Partners" of the Montreux Jazz Festival.

References

External links

 EU Business School Official Website
 Learning From Leaders conference series

Private schools in Switzerland
Business schools in Switzerland
Business schools in Spain
Business schools in Germany
Educational institutions established in 1973
Companies based in Geneva
Privately held companies of Switzerland
1973 establishments in Belgium